John Wyman is a British actor probably best known for his role as Erich Kriegler in the James Bond film For Your Eyes Only.

Career
In the 1970s, John Wyman played "The Mighty Ajax" in a series of UK television commercials for Ajax cleaning products. The character would appear in a dirty kitchen and with a powerful slash of his arm, he cleaned it to a sparkle. He has also appeared in television series such as The Onedin Line, Star Maidens, Blake's 7, The Fourth Arm and Tales of the Unexpected.

In 1977, his film career started with Richard Burton and Joan Plowright, in Sidney Lumet's Equus. The following year he starred in Revenge of the Pink Panther and Adventures of a Plumber's Mate, and appeared in the fantasy film Arabian Adventure in 1979. His big break came in 1981 when he appeared in For Your Eyes Only as Erich Kriegler, a villainous KGB henchman of Aristotle Kristatos.

He played Cliff (based very loosely on nightclub bouncer Cliff Twemlow in the 1982 film Tuxedo Warrior, and in 1991 he appeared as Donnor, the captain of the spaceship Firestar, in the film Firestar - First Contact for Ice International Films directed by David Kent-Watson.

Filmography

References

External links
 
 John Wyman Interview

Year of birth missing (living people)
Living people
British male film actors
British male television actors